Marisa Sartika Maladewi, (born June 28, 1993, in Yogyakarta) is an Indonesian super model, who was crowned Puteri Indonesia Lingkungan 2013, She represented Indonesia at the Miss International 2013 beauty pageant and ended-up won "Miss Beauty With Voice" and "Best National Costume" awards.

Personal life
Marisa was born in Yogyakarta – Indonesia. In 2005, Marisa and her family moved and have resided in Palembang, South Sumatra. She holds a bachelor degree in Science in Agriculture from Sriwijaya University in Palembang - South Sumatra. She began her career when she was competing at Puteri Indonesia 2013 and she won the title of Puteri Indonesia Lingkungan 2013.

Pageantry

Puteri Indonesia 2013
At 20 years old, Marisa competed in Puteri Indonesia beauty pageant, as the representative of South Sumatra province. Competing against 39 delegates across Indonesia. At the end of the competition, She won the title of Puteri Indonesia Lingkungan 2013, at the grand finale held in Jakarta Convention Center, Jakarta, Indonesia on February 1, by the outgoing titleholder of Puteri Indonesia Lingkungan 2011, Liza Elly Purnamasari of East Java.

Miss International 2013
As Puteri Indonesia Lingkungan, Marisa represented Indonesia at the 53rd edition of Miss International 2013 pageant in held in Tokyo Dome City Hall, Bunkyo, Tokyo, Japan. The finale was held on December 17, 2013, where she won "Miss Beauty With Voice" and "Best National Costume" awards.

References

External links
 Puteri Indonesia Official Website
 Miss International Official Website
 

1993 births
Living people
Puteri Indonesia contestants
Puteri Indonesia winners
Miss International 2013 delegates
Indonesian beauty pageant winners
Indonesian female models
Indonesian activists
Indonesian Muslims
Mental health activists
Javanese people
People from Palembang
People from South Sumatra